Yannick Jauzion (born 28 July 1978 in Castres) is a French former rugby union footballer.

Raised in Vénès, Tarn he played at centre for Stade Toulousain and the France national team. During the 2000's, Jauzion was regarded as one of the best centres in the world, if not the best inside centre the Northern hemisphere has seen during the pro era.

Jauzion was a member of the Toulouse team that reached the Heineken Cup final in 2003, 2004 and 2005, winning in 2003 and 2005. He was named as the man of the match in the 2005 Heineken Cup Final as Toulouse defeated Stade Français. He earned his first national cap on 16 June 2001 against South Africa. He played in France's Grand Slam winning teams of 2002 and 2004, but was ruled out of the 2006 Six Nations Championship through injury as France emerge as champions. He played all the matches during the 2007 Six Nations Championship that France won. He also scored the winning try in the 2007 World Cup quarterfinal against New Zealand that France won 20–18. In the 2009–2010 season, he played a central role as Toulouse won the Heineken Cup, with Jauzion collecting his third winners medal.

He retired on 26 June 2013.

Jauzion graduates École d'ingénieurs de Purpan.

References

External links
Yannick Jauzion's blog
ERC player record
RBS 6 Nations profile

Its Rugby Stats

1978 births
Living people
People from Castres
French rugby union players
Stade Toulousain players
Rugby union centres
France international rugby union players
Sportspeople from Tarn (department)
US Colomiers players
University of Toulouse alumni